Brandon Tyler McManus (born July 25, 1991) is an American football placekicker for the Denver Broncos of the National Football League (NFL). He was a member of their Super Bowl 50 championship team, beating the Carolina Panthers, and as of 2022, the last remaining member of the Super Bowl team on the Broncos' roster. He played college football at Temple and was signed by the Indianapolis Colts as an undrafted free agent in 2013. McManus has also been a member of the New York Giants.

College career
McManus holds the Temple career records for points scored (338), field goals made (60), field goals attempted (83), and punting average (45.3). As a senior in 2012, he earned All-Big East first-team honors after leading the team in scoring (74) on 14-of-17 field goals and 32-of-33 extra points. He averaged 45.1 yards per punt, pinned 17 punts inside the 20-yard line and had a long kick of 68 yards. McManus handled kickoff duties as well and recorded 40 touchbacks on 56 total kickoffs.

Professional career
After going undrafted in the 2013 NFL Draft, McManus signed with the Indianapolis Colts before being waived prior to the start of the season. In 2014, he played four preseason games for the New York Giants before being traded to the Denver Broncos to cover for the loss of the Broncos' starting kicker Matt Prater, who began the 2014 NFL season serving a four-game suspension. He became their starting kicker following the release of Prater on October 3, 2014. McManus was waived by the Broncos on November 11, 2014 after the team decided to sign free agent Connor Barth as his replacement. He was quickly re-signed by the Broncos after clearing waivers and spent the rest of the season as the team's kickoff specialist.

Going into the 2015 season, the Broncos brought both Barth and McManus to training camp. McManus won the job, proving more consistent than he had been in 2014, and the Broncos cut Barth.  On September 13, 2015, he became the third kicker in NFL history to make multiple field goals of 56 or more yards in the same game, joining Sebastian Janikowski and Greg Zuerlein, who both achieved the feat in the 2012 season. On October 18, McManus made the game winning overtime field goal to propel the Broncos to a 26–23 overtime win over the Cleveland Browns. In the Divisional Round of the playoffs, McManus tied an NFL-postseason record by making five field goals in a 23–16 victory over the Steelers at Sports Authority Field at Mile High. After defeating the New England Patriots in the AFC Championship, McManus and the Broncos advanced to the Super Bowl. In Super Bowl 50, he played a crucial role by making three field goals on three attempts and an extra point in the 24–10 victory over the Carolina Panthers. His 10 post-season field goals that year was also a Broncos franchise record.

On March 7, 2017, the Broncos placed a second round restricted free agent tender on McManus. On September 11, 2017, McManus signed a three-year contract extension with the Broncos.

On September 11, 2020, McManus signed a four-year, $17.2 million contract extension with the Broncos through the 2024 season. In Week 4 against the New York Jets, McManus hit a 53-yard field goal that stood as the game-winner in the 37-28 win, earning AFC Special Teams Player of the Week. In Week 6 against the New England Patriots, McManus scored all 18 of his team's points, converting 6 field goals during the 18–12 win.  McManus was named the AFC Special Teams of the Week for his performance in Week 6. He was placed on the reserve/COVID-19 list by the team on December 14, 2020, and activated on December 23.

In Week 14 of the 2021 season, McManus converted all five extra points and a 52-yard field goal in a 38-10 win over the Detroit Lions, earning AFC Special Teams Player of the Week.

In Week 17 of the 2021-2022 season, McManus kicked a career-long 61-yard field goal against the Los Angeles Chargers at the end of the first half.

NFL career statistics

|-
! style="text-align:center;"| 2014
! style="text-align:center;"| DEN
| 15 || 9 || 13 || 69.2 || 0 || 44 || 41 || 41 || 100.0 || 91 || 65.7 || 64 || 68
|-
! style="text-align:center;"| 2015
! style="text-align:center;background:#afe6ba;"| DEN
| 16 || 30 || 35 || 85.7 || 0 || 57 || 35 || 36 || 97.2 || 81 || 62.3 || 55 || 125
|-
! style="text-align:center;"| 2016
! style="text-align:center;"| DEN
| 16 || 29 || 34 || 85.3 || 0 || 55 || 32 || 33 || 97.0 || 79 || 61.6 || 51 || 119
|-
! style="text-align:center;"| 2017
! style="text-align:center;"| DEN
| 16 || 24 || 32 || 75.0 || 2 || 53 || 27 || 27 || 100.0 || 71 || 59.0 || 45 || 99
|-
! style="text-align:center;"| 2018
! style="text-align:center;"| DEN
| 16 || 20 || 25 || 80.0 || 0 || 53 || 35 || 35 || 100.0 || 73 || 61.3 || 42 || 95
|-
! style="text-align:center;"| 2019
! style="text-align:center;"| DEN
| 16 || 29 || 34 || 85.3 || 0 || 53 || 25 || 26 || 96.2 || 72 || 64.4 || 55 || 112
|-
! style="text-align:center;"| 2020
! style="text-align:center;"| DEN
| 15 || 28 || 34 || 82.4 || 2 || 58 || 24 || 27 || 88.9 || 73 || 61.9 || 54 || 108
|-
! style="text-align:center;"| 2021
! style="text-align:center;"| DEN
| 17 || 26 || 31 || 83.9 || 1 || 61 || 33 || 34 || 97.1 || 78 || 63.8 || 62 || 111 
|-
! style="text-align:center;"| 2022
! style="text-align:center;"| DEN
| 17 || 28 || 36 || 77.8 || 2 || 55 || 25 || 27 || 92.6 || 73 || 62.7 || 51 || 109
|-
! colspan="2" | Total || 144 || 223 || 274 || 81.4 || 7 || 61 || 277 || 286 || 96.9 || 691 || 62.6 || 479 || 946
|}

References

External links
 Denver Broncos bio
 Temple Owls bio
 

1991 births
Living people
Players of American football from Philadelphia
American football placekickers
Temple Owls football players
Indianapolis Colts players
New York Giants players
Denver Broncos players